Dmitry Ilyich Gordon (born October 21, 1967) is a Ukrainian journalist, interviewer, politician and singer. He is also the editor-in-chief of the newspaper "Boulevard" (from June 1995), later – "Gordon Boulevard". In June 2019, Gordon became the head of the election headquarters of the party Strength and Honor.

Biography
Dmitry was born on the 21-st of October 1967 in Kyiv to a Jewish family. His father, Ilya Gordon, was a civil engineer  and his mother, Mina Gordon, was an engineer-economist. Gordon started school at the age of six and finished it at 15. During his school years, he read a lot, was interested in the history of the Revolution, the Civil War and the Great Patriotic War. He was also keen on theatre, modern music and football. When he was in the fifth grade, he wrote about one hundred letters to famous people asking them to send him their photos with the signature. He got two replies: from Leonid Utyosov and Joseph Kobzon.

In 1988, he graduated from Kyiv Civil Engineering Institute. To tell the truth, as he recalls, all five institute years were a complete torture as this occupation was not his cup of tea. In his second year he started to collaborate with the leading Kyiv newspapers. During his years of study he published in the best Ukrainian newspapers such as "Vechirniy Kyiv" (literally "Evening Kyiv"), "Komsomolskoye Znamya" (literally "The Banner of Komsomol"), "Molodaya Ukraina" (literally "Young Ukraine"), "Sportivnaya Gazeta" (literally "Sports Newspaper"), "Molodaya Gvardiya" (literally "The Young Guard"), "Prapor Komunizmu" (literally "Banner of Communism"), and "Komsomolskaya Pravda" (literally "Komsomol Truth"). After the graduation Gordon worked for the newspapers "Vechirniy Kyiv", "Kievskiye Vedomosti" (literally "Kyiv Bulletin") and "All-Ukraine Vedomosti" (literally "All-Ukraine Bulletin").

Since 1995, he has been editing his own newspaper, a weekly of society columns "Boulevard" (since 2005 "Gordon Boulevard"). Today in Ukraine "Gordon Boulevard" is one of the most popular newspapers with high circulation. The readers of the weekly count more than 2.5 million people. The newspaper is distributed in Russia, the United States, Israel, Spain, Italy and Germany as well.

In June 2019, one month before the July 2019 Ukrainian parliamentary election, Gordon became the head of the election headquarters of the party Strength and Honor.

Gordon is the father of seven children. The elder son, Rostislav (born in 1992), is the student of Kyiv Institute of International Relations. The second son Dmitry, (born in 1995), is the four times champion of Europe in united combat sport in youth age group. He is also a composer of instrumental music and he plays the piano. Since 2012, he is a student of Berklee College of Music in Boston. Elizaveta (born in 1999) and Lev (born in 2001) are schoolchildren. His wife is Alesia Batsman – the editor of "Shuster Live". With Alesia, they have three daughters: Santa (2012), Alice (2016), Liana (2019).

Against Dmitry Gordon, not a Russian citizen, a criminal case was opened by Russian Investigative Committee. Russian authorities falsely accused Gordon of dissemination of fake information about the Russian army.

Career
Dmitry combines his job in the newspaper “Gordon Boulevard” with the publishing of his own books. There have been published more than 39 books up to now, including “The Heroes of Interlunation” in eight volumes. Dmitry is also the author of the TV program «Visiting Dmitry Gordon» (on Ukrainian TV since 2000). More than 500 celebrities were the heroes of the program: poets, writers, artists, directors, public figures, politicians and sportsmen, among them Mikhail Gorbachev, Sergei Khrushchev, Nikolai Amosov, Yevgeny Yevtushenko, Vitaly Korotich, Roman Viktyuk, Viktor Chernomyrdin, Leonid Kravchuk and Nikita Mikhalkov. The interviews are frank talks with famous people. Besides journalism, Dmitry is passionate about modern music. He recorded about 60 songs and released six albums. He made 8 video clips with Valery Leontiev, Alexander Rosenbaum, Tamara Gverdtsiteli, Natalia Mohylevska, Natalia Buchynska and solo.

Books

1999 – "My Soul Suffers Terribly…" Talks with Kashpirovsky.
2003 – "The Heroes of Interlunation". In eight volumes.
2004 – "The Stars of Popular Music".
2004 – "The Stars of Popular Music and Films".
2004 – "The Sports Stars".
2004 – "The Faces of Ukraine".
2004 – "Visiting Dmitry Gordon". In 2 volumes.
2005 – "In Private".
2006 – "Frankly Speaking".
2006 – "A Lifelong Dialogue".
2006 – "Speak Your Mind".
2007 – "Unedited".
2007 – "Têt-à-têt".
2008 – "Berezovsky and Korzhakov. The Kremlin Secrets".
2009 – "Gloss Free".
2009 – "From Sorrow to Joy".
2009 – "The Height of Loneliness".
2010 – "Son for Father".
2010 – "Under the Magnifying Glass".
2010 – "Between the Past and the Future".
2010 – "Viktor Suvorov. The Confession".
2011 – "Naughty Memory".
2012 – "The Moment of Truth".
2012 – "The Distant Close".
2012 – "Ten Hours in London. Berezovsky. Bukowski. Suvoro".
2013 – "The Men's Talk". 
2013 – "Frankly Speaking". 
2014 – "The Escape for the Soul".
2014 – "The Truth about Russia and Putin". 
2014 – "The Light and the Shade".

Discography
2006 – "There Are Two of Us".
2006 – "The First Time".
2006 – "I Am Smiling at You”
2006 – "Disquiet".
2006 – "Somebody Else’s Wife".

Videoclips 
 2002 — "Winter" ("Teddy Bear") – duet with Natalia Mohylevska.
 2002 — "The Violin Is Playing" – duet with Tamara Gverdtsiteli.
 2003 — "Chequered" – duet with Alexander Rosenbaum.
 2003 — "Happy New Year!".
 2004 — "There are Two of Us" – duet with Valery Leontiev.
 2005 — "I Am Smiling at You".
 2005 — "To Blokhin!".
 2006 — "The First Love" – duet with Natalia Buchynska.

References

Bibliography

External links
 
 Official site 

1967 births
Journalists from Kyiv
Kyiv National University of Construction and Architecture alumni
Ukrainian Jews
Musicians from Kyiv
Ukrainian male singers
Television presenters from Kyiv
Living people
Ukrainian YouTubers
People listed in Russia as foreign agents